The 2013 New Hampshire Wildcats football team represented the University of New Hampshire in the 2013 NCAA Division I FCS football season. They were led by 15th-year head coach Sean McDonnell and played their home games at Cowell Stadium. They were a member of the Colonial Athletic Association. They finished the season 10–5, 6–2 in CAA play to finish in a tie for second place. They received an at-large bid to the FCS Playoffs where they defeated Lafayette, Maine, and Southeastern Louisiana to advance to the semifinals where they lost to North Dakota State.

Schedule

Ranking movements

References

New Hampshire
New Hampshire Wildcats football seasons
New Hampshire
New Hampshire Wildcats football